Sagiv Cohen (born September 20, 1987) is an Israeli professional footballer who plays for F.C. Kafr Qasim.

Early life
Cohen was born in Rosh Ha'Ayin, Israel, to a Jewish family.

Career
Cohen had a breakout year during the 2006–07 season, but was unable to prevent Hapoel Petah Tikva from being relegated to the National league. He was rumored to be on his way out to a club in Europe, thanks in large part to his German passport, but in the end, was retained to help Hapoel Petah Tikva return to the Israeli Premier League.

At international level, Cohen was capped at levels from under-17 to under-19.

References

External links
Profile at hpt.co.il

1987 births
Living people
Israeli Jews
Israeli footballers
Footballers from Rosh HaAyin
Hapoel Petah Tikva F.C. players
Hapoel Nir Ramat HaSharon F.C. players
FC Politehnica Iași (2010) players
Hapoel Acre F.C. players
Maccabi Herzliya F.C. players
Hapoel Ramat Gan F.C. players
Hapoel Rishon LeZion F.C. players
F.C. Kafr Qasim players
Maccabiah Games competitors for Israel
Maccabiah Games footballers
Expatriate footballers in Romania
Israeli expatriate sportspeople in Romania
Liga Leumit players
Israeli Premier League players
Liga I players
Association football fullbacks